High Tide in Tucson is a 1995 book of twenty-five essays by author Barbara Kingsolver about family, community and ecology.  The book is titled after the first essay, in which she realizes that a hermit crab she accidentally brought home while beachcombing still times its activity to the rise and fall of the tides, even in an aquarium in Tucson, Arizona where there are no oceans or tides for hundreds of miles.
Some of the themes in the essay include the similarity and the relationship of humans with animals, and their proper places in nature.

1995 non-fiction books
Essay collections by Barbara Kingsolver
HarperCollins books
American essay collections
Books about environmentalism